Boris Slutsky (7 May 1919 in Slovyansk, Ukraine – 23 February 1986 in Tula) was a Soviet poet.

Biography 
Slutsky was born in Sloviansk in 1919.  He grew up in Kharkov. He first attended a lito (literary studio) at the Kharkov Pioneers Palace but left due to pressure from his father, who dismissed Russian poetry as a career.  In 1937, he entered the Law Institute of Moscow, and also studied at the Maxim Gorky Literature Institute from 1939 till 1941.  He joined a group of young poets including M. Kulchitzki, Pavel Kogan, S. Narovchatov, David Samoilov and others who became acquainted in autumn 1939 at the seminary of Ilya Selvinsky at the State Literary Publishing House, Goslitizdat and called themselves "the Generation of 1940". Slutsky, however, was not exposed to the Shoah poems Selvinsky and his peers was known for until the Khrushchev's Thaw of the late 1950s. This is attributed to way Shoah poets in the 1940s deferred publishing their works until safer times. Slutsky would become the only Russian poet who made the Holocaust a central focus of his writing.

Between 1941–1945 he served in the Red Army as a politruk of an infantry platoon. His war experiences are reflected much in his poetry. After the war, he had the rank of major. By 1946, he was living off a small disability pension and started working for radio station, then as an editor, and translator.

In 1956 Ilya Ehrenburg created a sensation with an article quoting a number of hitherto unpublished poems by Slutsky, and in 1957 Slutsky's first book of poetry, Memory, containing many poems written much earlier, was published.  Together with David Samoylov, Slutsky was probably the most important representative of the War generation of Russian poets and, because of the nature of his verse, a crucial figure in the post-Stalin literary revival. His poetry is deliberately coarse and jagged, prosaic and conversational.  There is a dry, polemic quality about it that reflects perhaps the poet's early training as a lawyer. Slutsky's search was evidently for a language stripped of poeticisms and ornamentation; he represented the opposite tendency to that of such neo-romantic or neo-futuristic poets as Andrey Voznesensky.

As early as in 1953–1954, prior to the 20th Congress of CPSU, verses condemning the Stalinist regime were attributed to Slutsky. These were circulated in "Samizdat" in the 1950s and in 1961 were published in an anthology in the West (in Munich). He did not confirm nor deny their authorship.

In his works Slutsky also approached Jewish themes, including material from the Jewish tradition, about antisemitism (including in Soviet society), the Holocaust, etc.

He translated to Russian from the Yiddish poetry, e.g., from works of Leib Kvitko, Aron Vergelis, Shmuel Galkin, Asher Shvartsman, and Yakov Sternberg.

He edited The Poets of Israel, a landmark publication considered the first anthology of Israeli poetry. It was published in 1963.

One of his cousins was the Israeli general Meir Amit.

Slutsky died 23 February 1986 in Tula, Russia.

References

External links
Boris Slutsky. Poems
Slutsky, Boris. Jewish Electronic Encyclopedia in Russian

1919 births
1986 deaths
Soviet poets
Jewish poets
Soviet Jews in the military
Ukrainian Jews

Soviet Jews
People from Sloviansk
Maxim Gorky Literature Institute alumni